is a Shinto shrine that is located in Kyoto, Japan. It is dedicated to the onmyōji, Abe no Seimei.

History

The Seimei Shrine was founded on the 4th year of the Kankō era (1007) by Emperor Ichijō, who ordered the shrine built in memory of Abe no Seimei, after his death in 1005.  It was constructed on the site of Abe no Seimei's house.

The main building was restored in 1925.

Architecture

Two torii gates lead up to the entrance of the shrine.

A famous well (Seimei-i) is located on the shrine grounds, and the water drawn from it is considered somewhat magical.  Tea master Sen no Rikyū was known to have brewed tea with the water from this well.

The pentacle, known locally as a Seimei-star, is an important symbol found on many parts of the shrine.  Abe no Seimei reputedly came up with the arcane insignia in the 10th century, symbolizing the Five Chinese Elements. Japanese bellflower (Platycodon grandiflorus) ornamentation are found in decorative tiles and lanterns.  The five petal tips of the flower are thought to represent the same ideal as the pentagram.

A nearby bridge, the Ichijō Modori-bashi is situated just south of the shrine, and is held to be a gateway between the human and spiritual realms.

Festivals

Seimei Matsuri (晴明祭) is held every year on the Autumnal equinox.

Images

See also

Abe no Seimei
Onmyōdō

References

External links
Official Site (Japanese)

Shinto shrines in Kyoto
Onmyōdō
1007 establishments
1000s establishments in Japan